Zhi Bingyi (19 September 1911 – 24 July 1993) was a Chinese scientist in the fields of telecommunications engineering, measuring instrument and Chinese character encoding. He was one of the earliest figures in Chinese history to have contributed to the science of characters computer processing. He has been hailed by many  as "Chinese characters information processing pioneer". He was an academician of the Chinese Academy of Sciences.

Biography
Zhi was born into a highly educated family in Taizhou County, Jiangsu, on 19 September 1911, while ancestral home in Zhenjiang. He secondary studied at Taizhou High School. In 1931, he was accepted to Zhejiang University, where he majored in the Department of Electrical Engineering. In 1934, he  pursued advanced studies in Germany, earning a doctor's degree in natural science from Leipzig University in 1944.

He returned to China in 1946 and that same year was recruited by the Central Industrial Laboratory as an engineer, as well as director of electronic laboratory. From 1947 to 1951, he was professor at Zhejiang University, Tongji University and Shanghai Aviation College.

In 1951, he founded the Yellow River Science and Technology Instrument Factory, which was merged into Shanghai Electric Meter Factory in 1954. After the institutional reform, he served as deputy chief engineer and director of central laboratory. In 1957, he engaged in the research on aging treatment of manganin resistance elements and solved the quality problem of domestic manganin. He also participated in the development of the first 5-bit DC digital voltmeter in China in the 1960s. In 1964, he was transferred to the Shanghai Institute of Electrical Instruments (later reshuffled as Shanghai Instrument Research Institute ), where he successively served as chief engineer, deputy director, director, and honorary director. In 1966, the Cultural Revolution broke out, two years later, he was denounced as a "reactionary academic authority" and suffered political persecution. During that time, he "worked on his ideas about a Chinese computer language in a squalid prison cell during the Cultural Revolution, writing his calculations on a teacup after his guards took away even his toilet paper." In September 1969, he was released from an isolation room. He was supervised to sweep the floor, clean the lathe, and then worked as a waste warehouse keeper. In his spare time, he used six years to invent the coding method of Jian Zi Shi Ma, which made a great contribution to Chinese character coding and Chinese character information processing. He joined the Communist Party in May 1991.

On 24 July 1993, he died of illness in Shanghai, aged 81.

Honours and awards
 1980 Chinese Academy of Sciences (CAS)

References

External links
Biography of Zhi Bingyi on the official website of the Chinese Academy of Sciences 

1911 births
1993 deaths
People from Taizhou, Jiangsu
Scientists from Jiangsu
Zhejiang University alumni
Leipzig University alumni
Academic staff of Zhejiang University
Academic staff of Tongji University
Members of the Chinese Academy of Sciences